Raymond John Albrecht (April 2, 1916 – July 24, 2006) was an American farmer and politician.

Albrecht was born in Penn Township, McLeod County, Minnesota. Albrecht lived with his wife and family in Brownton, Minnesota and was a dairy and grain farmer. Albrecht served in the Minnesota House of Representatives from 1975 to 1980 and was a Republican.

Notes

1916 births
2006 deaths
People from McLeod County, Minnesota
Farmers from Minnesota
Republican Party members of the Minnesota House of Representatives